Duskland is a studio album by American musician Zachary Cale. It was released in August 2015 under No Quarter Records.

Track list

References

2015 albums